Palatinate-Simmern-Sponheim was a state of the Holy Roman Empire based in the County Palatine of Simmern and the Palatinian portion of the County of Sponheim in modern Rhineland-Palatinate, Germany.

Palatinate-Simmern-Sponheim was created in 1559 when Frederick II of Palatinate-Simmern inherited the Electoral Palatinate and gave both Simmern and Sponheim to his younger brother George. George died in 1569 and was succeeded by another younger brother, Richard. After Richard's death in 1598, Palatinate-Simmern-Sponheim passed back to the Elector Palatine.

See also
 List of Counts Palatine of the Rhine

House of Wittelsbach
Counties of the Holy Roman Empire
1559 establishments in the Holy Roman Empire